Judith Fingeret Krug (March 15, 1940 – April 11, 2009) was an American librarian, freedom of speech proponent, and critic of censorship. Krug became director of the Office for Intellectual Freedom at the American Library Association in 1967. In 1969, she joined the Freedom to Read Foundation as its executive director. Krug co-founded Banned Books Week in 1982.

She coordinated the effort against the Communications Decency Act of 1996, which was the first attempt by the United States Congress to introduce a form of censorship of speech on the Internet. Krug strongly opposed the notion that libraries should censor the material that they provide to patrons. She supported laws and policies protecting the confidentiality of library use records. When the United States Department of Justice used the authority of the USA PATRIOT Act of 2001 to conduct searches of what once were confidential library databases, Krug raised a public outcry against this activity by the government.

In 2003, she was the leader of the initiative to challenge the constitutionality of the Children's Internet Protection Act. Her efforts led to a partial victory for anti-censorship campaigners; the Supreme Court of the United States ruled that the law was constitutional, but that filtering software on computers in public libraries could be turned off if so requested by an adult guardian. Krug warned that the filters used to censor Internet pornography from children were not perfect and risked blocking educational information about social matters, sexuality, and healthcare.

Early life and education
Krug was born Judith Fingeret in Pittsburgh, Pennsylvania, on March 15, 1940. Her interest in freedom of speech was fostered from an early age. She recalled reading a book about sex education under the covers in her bedroom with a flashlight at the age of 12. Her mother found her and asked what she was doing. When she held up the book, her mother allowed her to continue reading and told her to turn on the bedroom light so she could read properly and avoid damage to her eyes.

Krug studied for a  Bachelor of Arts degree at the University of Pittsburgh and graduated in 1962. She received a Master of Arts degree in library science from the Graduate Library School of the University of Chicago. Her Master's thesis compared indexing methodologies for accessing works of literature. She married Herbert Krug in 1964; they had two children and five grandchildren.

Library career

Office for Intellectual Freedom director

Krug began her library career in 1962 when she began working as a reference librarian at the John Crerar Library in Chicago. In 1963, she became a cataloguer for the Northwestern University Dental School. She became a research analyst for the American Library Association in 1965, and in 1967 she became director of its Office for Intellectual Freedom (OIF) upon its foundation. Krug described the role of the OIF as protection of the right of individuals in the U.S. to have comprehensive availability of information, regardless of those who disapprove of the material itself.

As director of the OIF, Krug organized publication of a newsletter which recounted instances of censorship in the U.S. and suggested ways to deal with these attempts to limit free speech. She supervised publication of the Intellectual Freedom Manual, the Newsletter on Intellectual Freedom, and the events of Banned Books Week. Krug also helped lead the Intellectual Freedom Round Table, the Committee on Professional Ethics, the Freedom to Read Foundation, and the Intellectual Freedom Committee. In 1969, Krug became the first head of the Freedom to Read Foundation, a sister organization to the OIF.

The Freedom to Read Foundation was formed to uphold the First Amendment to the United States Constitution and assist with legal defense. In her capacity as director of the OIF, Krug worked to start Banned Books Week in 1982. She coordinated opposition to the Communications Decency Act of 1996, which was the first attempt by the United States Congress to introduce a form of censorship of speech on the Internet.

Opposition to library censorship

Krug strongly opposed the notion that libraries ought to censor the material that they provide to patrons. She supported laws and policies protecting the confidentiality of library use records. When the United States Department of Justice used the authority of the USA PATRIOT Act of 2001 to conduct searches of once-confidential library databases, Krug raised a public outcry against this government action. When shortly after the September 11 attacks a Florida librarian told police that one of the attackers had been using the Delray Beach public libraryalthough Florida law guarantees confidentiality to library patronsKrug criticized the action. She stated she wished the librarian had adhered to Florida law, but empathized with the situation and said that most individuals would likely have done the same thing.

In 2003, Krug led the challenge to the constitutionality of the Children's Internet Protection Act. Her efforts led to a partial victory for the Act's opponents; the Supreme Court of the United States ruled that the law was constitutional, but that internet filtering software on computers in public libraries could be turned off if so requested by an adult guardian. She said that filters used to censor Internet pornography from children were not perfect and risked blocking educational information about social matters, sexuality, and healthcare. She emphasized the need to educate children about morality instead of using online filters to block information from them. In 2006, she was elected vice-president of the Phi Beta Kappa Society.

Krug served as chair of the board of directors of the Center for Democracy and Technology, chair of the Media Coalition, vice-chair of the Internet Education Foundation and was a member of the Advisory Board of GetNetWise. She sat on the 2006 panel of judges for the PEN/Newman's Own First Amendment Award, which recognizes those who defend the right to freedom of expression in writing enshrined in the First Amendment. Krug also served on the Boards of Directors of the Fund for Free Expression, the Illinois Division of the American Civil Liberties Union, the American Bar Association's Commission on Public Understanding About the Law, and the Advisory Council of the Illinois State Justice Commission.

Death and memorial
After being afflicted with stomach cancer for over a year, Krug died of her illness aged 69 on April 11, 2009, at Evanston Hospital in Evanston, Illinois. The Judith F. Krug Memorial Fund was founded by the American Library Association to ensure that Banned Books Week would remain active after her death. The eighth edition of the Intellectual Freedom Manual published in 2010 by the Office for Intellectual Freedom of the American Library Association was dedicated to Krug's memory.

Bibliography

As contributor

Awards and honors

See also
Censorship in the United States
Civil liberties in the United States
Freedom of the press in the United States
Freedom of speech in the United States
Free speech fights
List of librarians
List of University of Pittsburgh people

References

Further reading

External links

 "Intellectual Freedom 2002: Living the Chinese Curse" – Library of Congress' "Luminary Lecture" (Lecture presented by Krug on May 23, 2002), Library of Congress

Judith Krug's Testimony  before the Commission on Child Online Protection in August 2000, Commission on Child Online Protection
 

1940 births
2009 deaths
American activists
20th-century American Jews
American librarians
American women librarians
American Library Association people
Deaths from cancer in Illinois
Deaths from stomach cancer
Free speech activists
Northwestern University faculty
American Civil Liberties Union people
People from Chicago
People from Evanston, Illinois
University of Chicago alumni
University of Pittsburgh alumni
American librarianship and human rights
20th-century American women
20th-century American people
American women academics
21st-century American Jews
21st-century American women